Michael Bernard Cunningham  is a former senior British Police officer and was the Chief Executive of the College of Policing between 15 January 2018 and December 2020. Prior to this role, he was HM Inspector of Constabulary from 2014-2017.

Early life and education
Cunningham graduated from the University of Durham with a theology degree in 1984. Before joining the police he was a teacher for two years. In 2014, Staffordshire University bestowed the award of Honorary Doctor in recognition of his significant contribution to policing and law and order.

Police career
Cunningham joined Lancashire Constabulary in 1987 and after completing the police Strategic Command Course in 2005, he became Assistant Chief Constable, taking responsibility for operational policing. He later was the Chief Constable of Staffordshire Police from September 2009 to 2014.  In July 2014, he was appointed Her Majesty’s Inspector of Constabulary.

In January 2018, he became the chief executive of College of Policing.

Despite announcing his retirement from policing, in April 2021 Cunningham joined Skills for Justice as an associate to “keep police leaders ahead of their game today to develop a service fit for tomorrow.”

Honours
Cunningham was awarded the Queen's Police Medal in the 2013 New Years Honours and was appointed Commander of the Order of the British Empire (CBE) in the 2021 Birthday Honours for services to policing and public service.

References

British Chief Constables
Living people
English recipients of the Queen's Police Medal
1961 births
Alumni of University College, Durham
Inspectors of Constabulary
Commanders of the Order of the British Empire